Mixon may refer to:

Places
 Mixon, Texas, an unincorporated community in northern Cherokee County, Texas, United States
 Mixon Rocks, a rock outcrop in Antarctica

People with the surname
 Abdul Tawala Ibn Ali Alishtari, also known as Michael Mixon
 Autry DeWalt Mixon, Jr., better known as Junior Walker (1931-1995), American musician
 Benjamin R. Mixon (born 1953), American army officer
 Danny Mixon (born 1949), American jazz pianist
 Jamal Mixon (born 1983), American actor
 Jerod Mixon (born 1981), American actor
 Joe Mixon (born 1996), American football player
 Katy Mixon (born 1981), American actress
 Kenny Mixon (born 1975), American football player
 Laura J. Mixon, American author
 Lovelle Mixon (1983?-2009), American felon, perpetrator of 2009 Oakland CA police shootout
 Mick Mixon, American radio announcer
 Myron Mixon (born 1962), American barbecue chef 
 Tim Mixon (born 1984), American football player

See also

Mixson, surname